The men's 5000 metres event at the 2020 Summer Olympics took place on 3 and 6 August 2021 at the Japan National Stadium. Approximately 45 athletes competed; the exact number was dependent on how many nations use universality places to enter athletes in addition to the 42 qualifying through time or ranking (6 universality places were used in 2016).

Summary
After setting the world record in a near time trial in 2020, Joshua Cheptegei was the overwhelming favorite. Mo Farah, the London 2012 and Rio 2016 Olympic champion, had failed to meet the Olympic qualifying standard. Bronze medalist Hagos Gebrhiwet also did not return, but silver medalist Paul Chelimo was back for another go. None of the Ethiopian medalists from the World Championships came, but Canadian World Championship bronze medalist Mohammed Ahmed was. The Ugandan team came in force again to play team tactics that didn't quite get the desired results in the 10,000 earlier in the week, while Ethiopia only qualified one athlete into the final and Kenya two. An additional unknown was the find of the season Mohamed Katir who ran historical times in the 1500, 3000 and 5000 in the run up to the Olympics. Nobody, not even Katir, knew what kind of kick he would have if he were still in contention at the end. It is already almost predetermined a major championship race will go down to a last lap kick. Tactics are involved to try to keep the number fighting on that final lap to a minimum.

From the start of the final, Cheptegei took the lead, marked by Milkesa Mengesha while several other contenders took their looks at the leader. After two laps, Jacob Kiplimo worked his way through the pack and Cheptegei gave way to his teammate. Cheptegei dropped back a few places while Chelimo took Kiplimo seriously and moved into marking position just ahead of Mengesha. The lead group of Kiplimo, Chelimo, Mengesha, Nicholas Kimeli and Cheptegei stayed in order for four laps, while the rest of the field was in single file behind them. Half way through the race, Kiplimo's pace slowed slightly and Cheptegei moved back up to the front to keep pushing. After another lap, the pack began to bunch up again, half the field moving into lane 2 to have room to maneuver, Kimeli immediately to Cheptegei's right side. After a half lap to think about it, Kimeli moved ahead, then marked by Mengesha. Just before three laps to go, Chelimo ran around the crowd to take the lead, which only lasted for half a lap before Kimeli and Mengesha restored order. The lead group was down to 9, the runners packed so tight there was some jostling and pushing, Chelimo losing his balance but staying on his feet. Out of the jostling, Cheptegei was back on point with 500m to go. Kimeli made a rush at the bell to be second over the line ahead of Chelimo. The front six had dropped the others, Kiplimo, Ahmed and Birhanu Balew. Balew fell off on the backstretch, and as Chelimo and Ahmed cued up behind Kimeli, Kiplimo was off the back in the turn. Kimeli went wide off the turn, possibly thinking he can run down Cheptegei. Chelimo saw the opportunity and passed on the inside, Ahmed on his heels. Then Ahmed passed Chelimo on the inside and went off in chase of Cheptegei. But there was not enough real estate before Cheptegei crossed the finish line, followed by Ahmed. Behind them, Kimeli came back on Chelimo. Both were racing side by side for the bronze. First Kimeli had a few inches, then Chelimo regained the edge. Five metres out from the finish, the exhausted Chelimo stumbled, the quick steps causing him to get ahead of Kimeli. He managed two more steps falling forward across the line before crashing to the track, Chelimo's off balance angle crossing the line the difference to give him the bronze.

Background
This was the 25th time the event was held, having appeared at every Olympics since 1912.

Qualification

A National Olympic Committee (NOC) could enter up to 3 qualified athletes in the men's 5000 metres event if all athletes meet the entry standard or qualify by ranking during the qualifying period. (The limit of 3 has been in place since the 1930 Olympic Congress.) The qualifying standard is 13:13.50. This standard was "set for the sole purpose of qualifying athletes with exceptional performances unable to qualify through the IAAF World Rankings pathway." The world rankings, based on the average of the best five results for the athlete over the qualifying period and weighted by the importance of the meet, will then be used to qualify athletes until the cap of 42 is reached.

The qualifying period was originally from 1 May 2019 to 29 June 2020. Due to the COVID-19 pandemic, the period was suspended from 6 April 2020 to 30 November 2020, with the end date extended to 29 June 2021. The world rankings period start date was also changed from 1 May 2019 to 30 June 2020; athletes who had met the qualifying standard during that time were still qualified, but those using world rankings would not be able to count performances during that time. The qualifying time standards could be obtained in various meets during the given period that have the approval of the IAAF. Both indoor and outdoor meets were eligible for qualifying. The most recent Area Championships may be counted in the ranking, even if not during the qualifying period.

NOCs can also use their universality place—each NOC can enter one male athlete regardless of time if they had no male athletes meeting the entry standard for an athletics event—in the 5000 metres.

Men's 5000 m 
Entry number: 42. 4 withdrew after qualification ended, 2 universality places.

Competition format
The event continued to use the two-round format introduced in 2012.

Records
Prior to this competition, the existing world and Olympic records were as follows.

The following national records were established during the competition:

Schedule
All times are Japan Standard Time (UTC+9)

The men's 5000 metres took place over two separate days.

Results

Round 1
Qualification Rules: First 5 in each heat (Q) and the next 5 fastest (q) advance to the Final.

Heat 1

Heat 2

Final 
Source:

References

Men's 5000 metres
2020
Men's events at the 2020 Summer Olympics